The 2023 South American U-20 Championship was the 30th edition of the South American U-20 Championship, the biennial international youth football championship organised by CONMEBOL for the men's under-20 national teams of South America. It was held in Colombia between 19 January and 12 February 2023.

The South American U-20 Championship returns after 4 years due to the COVID-19 pandemic forced CONMEBOL to cancel the tournament in 2021.

The tournament served as qualifier for two international events. The top four teams qualified for the 2023 FIFA U-20 World Cup in Indonesia as the CONMEBOL representatives. The top three teams also qualified for the 2023 Pan American Games men's football tournament, in addition to Chile who automatically qualified as hosts.

After twelve years, Brazil won the tournament again after finishing first in the final stage's group, which meant the twelfth title in their history. Champions Brazil, runners-up Uruguay and the hosts and third place Colombia qualified for the 2023 FIFA U-20 World Cup and 2023 Pan American Games. Defending champions Ecuador managed to reach the last berth for the 2023 FIFA U-20 World Cup after finishing in fourth place.

Teams
All ten CONMEBOL member national teams are eligible to enter the tournament.

Venues
Colombia had been originally chosen to host the South American U-20 Championship that was to be held in 2021. That tournament ended up being canceled due to the COVID-19 pandemic, however, Colombia maintained its right to hold the South American U-20 Championship but in 2023. This was the fifth time that Colombia hosts the tournament having previously done so in 1964, 1987, 1992 and 2005.

Cali and Bogotá were selected as host cities. Cali hosted the first stage's matches in two venues, the Estadio Olímpico Pascual Guerrero and the Estadio Deportivo Cali. The final stage's matches were played in Bogotá also in two venues, the Estadio El Campín and the Estadio Metropolitano de Techo.

Match officials
On 9 December 2022, CONMEBOL announced a total of 11 referees and 22 assistant referees appointed for the tournament, included a Portuguese refereeing team. For the first time, a UEFA refereeing team will participate in the South American U-20 Championship as part of the UEFA–CONMEBOL memorandum of understanding signed in February 2020, which included a referee exchange programme.

Portuguese referee João Pinheiro was replaced by his fellow countryman António Nobre.

 Nicolás Lamolina
Assistants: Maximiliano Del Yesso and Facundo Rodríguez
 Ivo Méndez
Assistants: Ariel Guizada and Carlos Tapia
 Braulio Machado
Assistants: Fabricio Vilarinho and Rafael Alves
 Cristian Garay
Assistants: Claudio Urrutia and Alejandro Molina
 Carlos Ortega
Assistants: Jhon León and John Gallego
 Guillermo Guerrero
Assistants: Ricardo Barén and Dennys Guerrero

 Derlis López
Assistants: Roberto Cañete and Luis Onieva
 Augusto Menéndez
Assistants: Stephen Atoche and Leonar Soto
 António Nobre
Assistants: Bruno Alves and Luciano Maia
 Gustavo Tejera
Assistants: Andrés Nievas and Horacio Ferreiro
 Yender Herrera
Assistants: Lubin Torrealba and Alberto Ponte

Squads

Players born between 1 January 2003 and 31 December 2007 were eligible to compete in the tournament. Each team could register a maximum of 23 and a minimum of 19 players, including at least 3 goalkeepers (Regulations Articles 46 and 49).

Draw
The draw of the tournament was held on 21 December 2022, 14:00 PYT (UTC−3), at the CONMEBOL headquarters in Luque, Paraguay. The ten teams were drawn into two groups of five. The hosts Colombia and defending champions Ecuador were seeded into Group A and Group B respectively and assigned to position 1 in their group, while the remaining teams were placed into four "pairing pots" according to their results in the 2019 South American U-20 Championship (shown in brackets).

From each pot, the first team drawn was placed into Group A and the second team drawn was placed into Group B. In both groups, teams from pot 1 were allocated in position 2, teams from pot 2 in position 3, teams from pot 3 in position 4 and teams from pot 4 in position 5.

The draw resulted in the following groups:

First stage
The top three teams in each group advanced to the final stage.

Tiebreakers
In the first stage, teams were ranked according to points earned (3 points for a win, 1 point for a draw, 0 points for a loss). If tied on points, tiebreakers would be applied in the following order (Regulations Article 21):
Head-to-head result between tied teams;
Points in head-to-head matches among the tied teams;
Goal difference in head-to-head matches among the tied teams;
Goals scored in head-to-head matches among the tied teams;
Goal difference in all group matches;
Goals scored in all group matches;
Fewest red cards received;
Fewest yellow cards received;
Drawing of lots.

All match times are in COT (UTC−5), as listed by CONMEBOL.

Group A

Group B

Final stage
If teams finish level on points, the final rankings would be determined according to the same criteria as the first stage, taking into account only matches in the final stage.

All match times are in COT (UTC−5), as listed by CONMEBOL.

Goalscorers

Qualification for international tournaments

Qualified teams for FIFA U-20 World Cup
The following four teams from CONMEBOL qualified for the 2023 FIFA U-20 World Cup in Indonesia.

1 Bold indicates champions for that year. Italic indicates hosts for that year.

Qualified teams for Pan American Games
The following four teams from CONMEBOL qualified for the 2023 Pan American Games men's football tournament, including Chile which qualified as hosts.

2 Bold indicates champions for that year. Italic indicates hosts for that year.

Broadcasting rights

Radio 
 : Blu Radio, Caracol Radio, RCN Radio

Television 
  Argentina: TyC Sports
  Brazil: TV Globo, SporTV
  Bolivia: Unitel
  Chile: Canal 13
  Colombia: Caracol Televisión, RCN Televisión, Telepacífico
  Ecuador: DSports
  Paraguay:  and Datisa
  Peru: DSports, Latina
  Uruguay: Dexary
  Venezuela: Televen

References

External links

2023
2023 South American U-20 Championship
2023 in South American football
2023 in youth association football
2023 in Colombian football
January 2023 sports events in South America
February 2023 sports events in South America
Qualification tournaments for the 2023 Pan American Games
2023 FIFA U-20 World Cup qualification